Address spoofing  may refer to:
 IP address spoofing
 MAC spoofing